Sonja Vlahović (born 1969) is a politician in Serbia. She has served in the National Assembly of Serbia since 2014 as a member of the Serbian Progressive Party.

Early life and career
Vlahović was born in Peć, Socialist Autonomous Province of Kosovo, in what was then the Socialist Republic of Serbia in the Socialist Federal Republic of Yugoslavia. She has a bachelor's degree as an economist and now lives in the Belgrade municipality of New Belgrade.

Political career
Vlahović received the 117th position on the Progressive Party's Aleksandar Vučić — Future We Believe In electoral list for the 2014 Serbian parliamentary election and was elected when the list won a landslide victory with 158 out of 250 mandates. She was given the 111th position on the successor Aleksandar Vučić — Serbia Is Winning list for the 2016 parliamentary election and was re-elected when the list won 131 mandates. During the 2016–20 parliament, she was a member of the assembly's environmental protection committee and the committee on finance, state budget, and control of public spending; a deputy member of the committee on Kosovo-Metohija; and a member of the parliamentary friendship groups with Belarus, Cuba, India, Indonesia, Kazakhstan, Montenegro, Russia, and Uganda.

Vlahović received the 185th position on the Progressive Party's Aleksandar Vučić — For Our Children list for the 2020 election and was elected to a third term when the list won an increased majority with 188 mandates. She is now a member of the committee on finance, state budget, and control of public spending; a deputy member of the committee on the economy, regional development, trade, tourism, and energy; a deputy member of the committee on administrative, budgetary, mandate, and immunity issues; and a member of the parliamentary friendship groups with Canada, China, France, Germany, Italy, Russia, Slovenia, and Switzerland.

References

1986 births
Living people
Politicians from Peja
Kosovo Serbs
Politicians from Belgrade
21st-century Serbian women politicians
21st-century Serbian politicians
Members of the National Assembly (Serbia)
Serbian Progressive Party politicians
Women members of the National Assembly (Serbia)